(until 1949 Mosty;) is a municipality and village in Frýdek-Místek District in the Moravian-Silesian Region of the Czech Republic. It has about 3,700 inhabitants.

Polish minority makes up 13.3% of the population.

Etymology
The name literally means "bridges" near Jablunkov". It is connected with an ancient trade route passing through swamps and marshes in today's territory of the village. They were bridged by wooden beams and logs by the so-called mostors or mościorze, who gave the village its name.

Geography
Mosty u Jablunkova is located in the historical region of Cieszyn Silesia on the border with Slovakia. The village is located in the Jablunkov Pass. The western half of the municipality lies in the Moravian-Silesian Beskids, the eastern part extends into the Jablunkov Intermontane region and the northern part extends in to the Jablunkov Furrow.

History
The first written mention of Mosty u Jablunkova is from 1577 as Mosty Jablunkowske. It belonged to the Duchy of Teschen. The village was founded between 1545 and 1577, during the reign of Wenceslaus III Adam, Duke of Cieszyn.

After Revolutions of 1848 in the Austrian Empire a modern municipal division was introduced in the re-established Austrian Silesia. The village as a municipality was subscribed to the political district of Teschen and the legal district of Jablunkau. According to the censuses conducted in 1880–1910 the population of the municipality grew from 1,959 in 1880 to 2,318 in 1910 with a majority being native Polish-speakers (growing from 98% in 1880 to 98.5% in 1910) accompanied by German-speaking (at most 2% in 1880) and Czech-speaking people (at most 0.3% in 1900). In terms of religion in 1910 the majority were Roman Catholics (98.6%), followed by Protestants (1.1%) and Jews (6 people).

After World War I, Polish–Czechoslovak War and the division of Cieszyn Silesia in 1920, it became a part of Czechoslovakia. Following the Munich Agreement, in October 1938 together with the Zaolzie region it was annexed by Poland, administratively adjoined to Cieszyn County of Silesian Voivodeship.

The municipality was annexed by Nazi Germany at the beginning of World War II. On 25/26 August 1939 a group of German Abwehr armed agents attacked the rail station in Mosty. The incident became known as Jabłonków incident. After the war it was restored to Czechoslovakia.

Transport

European route E75 runs through Mosty u Jablunkova and continues to Slovakia. There are the Mosty u Jablunkova / Čadca road and railway border crossings. The second road border crossing is Šance / Čadca-Milošová

Mosty u Jablunkova lies on the railway lines Ostrava–Třinec–Mosty u Jablunkova and Čadca–Mosty u Jablunkova. The municipality is served by two railway stations. Buses connect Mosty u Jablunkova with Třinec, Jablunkov and Hrčava.

Sport
There is a ski resort with four pistes in the municipality.

In Mosty u Jablunkova is a small aquapark operated by the municipality.

Sights

The historic landmark is the Church of Saint Hedwig. It was built in 1785–1787.

Velká Šance was a part of a unique fortification system built in the 16th–19th centuries which was to prevent the enemy from passing through the Jablunkov Pass. To this day, only the moats with ramparts, the defensive moat and the remains of the walls of the original fortifications have been preserved. There is a visitor centre with exhibitions on the functioning of fortifications and about the weapons of the then crew.

Notable people
Franciszek Pokorny (1891–1966), Polish Army officer

References

External links

Villages in Frýdek-Místek District
Cieszyn Silesia